The 1934 Manhattan Jaspers football team was an American football team that represented Manhattan College as an independent during the 1934 college football season.  In its third season under head coach Chick Meehan, the team compiled a 3–5–1 record. In intersectional games, Manhattan tied with Kansas State and lost to Michigan State. The team played all of its games at Ebbets Field in Brooklyn.

Schedule

References

Manhattan
Manhattan Jaspers football seasons
Manhattan Jaspers football
1930s in Brooklyn
Flatbush, Brooklyn